Ingeldorf is a small town in the commune of Erpeldange, in central Luxembourg.  , the town has a population of 805.

Diekirch (canton)
Towns in Luxembourg